Lee Eung-kyung (born February 3, 1966) is a South Korean actress. She began her acting career in 1987, and has since appeared in films and television dramas such as Palace of Dreams and Aeja's Older Sister, Minja.

Filmography

Film

Television series

Awards and nominations

References

External links

Lee Eung-kyung at Ares Entertainment
Lee Eung-kyung Fan Cafe at Daum

1966 births
Living people
South Korean television actresses
South Korean film actresses
20th-century South Korean actresses
21st-century South Korean actresses